The Rhine-Neckar S-Bahn (S-Bahn RheinNeckar) forms the backbone of the urban rail transport network of the Rhine Neckar Area, including the cities of Mannheim, Heidelberg and Ludwigshafen.

S-Bahn trains operate about 7.5 million kilometres per year, with 113 stations served by class 425 electric multiple units.

Network
The core area is in the states of Rhineland-Palatinate and Baden-Württemberg. At Homburg (Saar), it touches the Saarland and it has three stations in Hesse between Neckarsteinach and Hirschhorn. Four of the seven lines run together on the core Schifferstadt–Ludwigshafen–Mannheim–Heidelberg section. Beyond this main line, the S-Bahn operates over six lines with terminuses in Homburg, Osterburken, Karlsruhe, Germersheim, Bruchsal, Eppingen, Aglasterhausen, Mainz and Bensheim.

Services operate on weekdays at intervals of 30 or 60 minutes. The lines are shared with the other passenger and freight traffic.

New lines 
As part of the second expansion phase, the following three lines, which are currently still operating as Regionalbahn services and are already operated by the Rhine-Neckar S-Bahn, will be added to the S-Bahn network. A total of 158 stations will be served.

Rebuilt class 425 sets have been used on the line to Mainz since December 2017. Trains on this line have operated officially as the S 6 since 10 June 2018.

Operating pattern
All lines have a 60-minute basic frequency. As a result of largely overlapping alignments in the core area services run at half-hourly frequency. On the core line between Schifferstadt and Heidelberg four lines run, each at hourly intervals, but due to problems of coordination may not provide a pure 15-minute interval schedule. Ludwigshafen-Rheingönheim and Ludwigshafen-Mundenheim are not usually served by lines S1 and S3. Line S1 usually serves Mannheim Rangierbahnhof and Mannheim-Seckenheim. On Saturday afternoons and Sundays, S2 from Kaiserslautern terminates in Heidelberg and S4 runs only between Germersheim and Mannheim.

Although the lines run from 05:00 until 01:30, regular interval operations usually run only between about 08:00 and 21:00.

History

On 14 December 2003, the Rhine-Neckar area became the last large densely populated area in Germany with an S-Bahn system—planning had lasted decades and involved the cooperation of the states of Baden-Württemberg, Hesse and Rhineland-Palatinate. Following European-wide advertising for tenders, operation for 12 years from 2002 until 2015 was awarded to DB Regio.

First stage of development 

Beginning in 2001, the lines and stations were prepared for S-Bahn operations. €260 million was invested for construction and €190 million for vehicles. An extra bridge was built over the Rhine between Mannheim and Ludwigshafen, urgently required to increase capacity, a by-pass of Schifferstadt for long-distance traffic and Ludwigshafen-Mitte S-Bahn station in Berliner Platz. A new S-Bahn workshop was established near Ludwigshafen Hauptbahnhof.

It was considered important to provide a large amount of uniform equipment at the stations. They received new platform equipment, such as waiting rooms and seating.

The platforms at Mannheim-Seckenheim, Mannheim-Rangierbahnhof, Ludwigshafen-Mundenheim and Ludwigshafen-Rheingönheim were raised temporarily using wooden planks, since no decision had been made on the final configuration of the track or the future position of the platforms.

Extension to Germersheim
The first stage was completed at the end of 2006 with the extension from Homburg to Kaiserslautern and the Mannheim-Speyer route to Germersheim. The Speyer route required electrification south of Schifferstadt and modification of three stations. A new station is under construction at Speyer Süd, but its opening has been delayed. A further extension from Germersheim to Graben-Neudorf to Bruchsal was opened in December 2011 and an extension of line S5 of the Karlsruhe Stadtbahn from Wörth am Rhein to Germersheim was opened in December 2010.

Extension to Homburg (Saar)

The upgrade of the Mannheim–Kaiserslautern line to Homburg was carried out as an urgent project in preparation for the 2006 FIFA World Cup. However, it was not finished in time and services commenced in December 2006. Only line S1 runs to Homburg; S2 continues to terminate in Kaiserslautern. The city of Homburg did not participate financially in this extension.

Second stage of expansion 
[[File:RheinNeckar S-Bahn Planung 2010.png|thumb|Original network plan for the 2010 Rhine-Neckar clock-face timetable from 2004]]

Shortly after the start of operation, a second stage of expansion was planned for the Rhine-Neckar S-Bahn to integrate previously unserved cities and regions into the S-Bahn network. However, the schedule laid down in the Realisierungsprogramm Rhein-Neckar-Takt 2010 (implementation program for the 2010 Rhine-Neckar clock-face timetable), which provided for further expansion to Homburg, Bruchsal, Karlsruhe, Eppingen, Darmstadt and Worms, between 2008 and 2010, was rejected again in 2006. The reasons for this were the reduction of funds made available under the federal Rail Regionalisation Act (Regionalisierungsgesetz) in accordance with the so-called "Koch-Steinbrück paper" as well as the need to finance infrastructure measures required for capacity increases in the north of the region, in particular the Frankfurt–Mannheim high-speed railway.

 Heidelberg–Eppingen/Aglasterhausen 
In November 2000, the Verkehrsforum 2000 proposed an extension to Eppingen for the first time. In August 2002, a "standardised assessment" for the electrification of all three routes to Aglasterhausen, Bad Friedrichshall-Jagstfeld and Eppingen showed a benefit-cost ratio of 3.7. The district administrator and former director of the Rhine-Neckar Metropolitan Region, Stefan Dallinger, stated that he was not aware of any project with such a good result.  The board of the ZRN approved the modernisation in December 2003. The planning agreement was signed on 13 May 2004 and the construction and financing contract on 20 September 2007.

The project was to cost €81.5 million, of which €66.9 m was for eligible building costs, of which the federal government paid 60% and the state of Baden-Württemberg paid 20% under the Municipal Transport Financing Act (Gemeindeverkehrsfinanzierungsgesetz). The remaining costs were assumed by the municipalities and districts.

The modernisation of 78 kilometres of line covered  of track and included the installation of about 1180 sets of overhead masts. On 10 October 2009, the overhead line was switched on.

Since December 2009, the new line S 5 has operated from Heidelberg Hbf on the Neckar Valley Railway and the Elsenz Valley Railway to Sinsheim or every hour on the Steinsfurt–Eppingen railway to Eppingen. Trains only occasionally stopped at the two Heidelberg halts of  Schlierbach/Ziegelhausen and Orthopädie for scheduling reasons until December 2016 and only hourly after that. Line S 51 was opened in June 2010; this branches off in Meckesheim over the Meckesheim–Neckarelz railway and runs every hour to Aglasterhausen.

In Eppingen there is connection to line S 4 of the Karlsruhe Stadtbahn and the Heilbronn Stadtbahn. Since December 2014, with the integration of the eastern Elsenz Valley Railway in the northern branch of the Heilbronn Stadtbahn, there has also been a connection to Heilbronn in Sinsheim.

 Extension from Germersheim to Bruchsal 

The second stage of expansion also included the integration of the Bruhrain Railway from Germersheim via Graben-Neudorf to Bruchsal into the S-Bahn network. This route was added to the S-Bahn network at the 2011/2012 timetable change on 11 December 2011 and is used by an extension of the S 4, but which is designated as the S 33 to avoid confusion with a line of the Karlsruhe Stadtbahn.

This required considerable modernisation and electrification between Graben-Neudorf and Germersheim. In addition, the three new stops of Germersheim Mitte/Rhein, Bruchsal Am Mantel and Bruchsal Sportzentrum were built. The upgrade of the line began in early July 2010 and lasted 17 months. The cost of the infrastructure work amounted to approximately €31.7 m. All stations were adapted for the disabled and made barrier-free. The only exception was the halt of Bruchsal Am Mantel, which had no ramps and lifts for part of 2012.

 Mainz–Worms–Frankenthal–Ludwigshafen am Rhein–Mannheim 

The Mainz–Ludwigshafen railway was integrated into the route of the new line S 6 at the minor timetable change on 10 June 2018. Early operations of S-Bahn trains using adapted class 425 stock were implemented on the Mainz–Worms–Frankenthal–Ludwigshafen am Rhein–Mannheim(–Weinheim–Bensheim) Regionalbahn route from the beginning of 2006. Line S 6 replaced the previous Regionalbahn RB 44 service.

In addition to the conversion of existing stations to make them compatible with S-Bahn operations, the new stations were opened in Dienheim and Frankenthal Süd at the timetable change on 14 June 2015. Construction began in 2012 and 2013 at Mainz Römisches Theater, Ludwigshafen-Oggersheim, Mettenheim and Bodenheim, and work at another ten stations was completed by June 2016. Mettenheim station was completed in September 2013. The planned establishment of stations in Roxheim and Worms Süd was abandoned as the responsible municipalities were unwilling to fund them.

 Ludwigshafen Hbf–Ludwigshafen BASF Nord 
BASF SE in Ludwigshafen and its three stops, BASF Nord, BASF Mitte and BASF Süd, have been served by the S-Bahn since December 2018. This required the line to be upgraded and electrified. Since then, it has been served by trains operating as line S 4.

 Mannheim Hauptbahnhof – platform F 
In order to increase the capacity at Mannheim Hauptbahnhof and to avoid the problems caused by two trains stopping simultaneously at each end of the same platform track on platform tracks 7, 9 and 10, the new platform F, which faces tracks 11 and 12, was built from September 2014. This was built exclusively for local traffic. The future S-Bahn line S 8 (Mannheim–Schwetzingen–Waghäusel–Karlsruhe) will use it. It will also be used by RE 1 (Koblenz–Trier–Saarbrücken–Mannheim) and RE 14 (Mainz–Mannheim). In preparation, the freight train tracks had to be relaid closer to the B 36 first.

Track 12 was already in operation at the end of 2016, while track 11 was completed in August 2017. Since track 12 was already operating while the passenger underpass at the northern end of the platform had not been completed, a temporary solution had to be put in place by July 2017. Access to track 12 was therefore via track 10a and from there over a bridge to the new platform. However, track 10a had to be blocked for train traffic. Track 10b continued to be used, but only from the south.

 Contracting of operations from 2016 
Following a call of tenders in December 2013, DB Regio was awarded the contract for lot 1 (S1, S2, S3, S4, S33) with approximately 8 million train-kilometres per year for the period from December 2016 to December 2033. The intervening year due to delays in the tender was covered by a transitional concession. The traffic continues to be operated with Class 425 multiple units upgraded for the purpose. In order to increase seating capacity, the rolling stock fleet is being expanded from 40 to 77 carriages, reaching 64 carriages in 2018 for the time being, achieved by adding six 425.3 sets acquired from Hannover. The package also includes push-pull trains to run to BASF from December 2017 and an improved service to Homburg from 2019. A quarter of the trains would be occupied by train attendants; in Rhineland-Palatinate this applies to all trains after 7 PM and half before.Nahverkehrsgesellschaft Baden-Württemberg (Baden-Württemberg local transport company; NVBW) advertised lot 2, network 6b, by Europe-wide tender at the end of September 2015 after several delays. Originally, the tender was scheduled for early 2014. It includes operations on the line to Mainz and amounts to six million train-kilometres annually. The transfer of operations for a term of 15 years would take place at the end of 2020 and the line to Mainz would follow at the end of 2021. As with the tendering of operations of the Stuttgart RE network, this contract was based on an early 2015 law on the contracting of the provision of railway operations in Baden-Württemberg. In December 2016, the contracting authorities decided to postpone the transfer of railway operations until December 2020, as it could already be foreseen—even before the end of negotiations on the contract—that the required new rolling stock would otherwise not be available on time. On 20 June 2017, after none of the unsuccessful bidders had filed a petition for review, DB Regio was awarded the contract. The included lines (S5, S6, S8, S9) will be operated by new Siemens Mireo rolling stock. A corresponding contract for 57 three-part sets was signed between DB Regio AG and Siemens in August 2017.

 Further planning 
The second stage of construction includes further projects that should have been implemented gradually by the end of 2017.

Development of the Rhine Valley Railway
Due to the high utilisation on the Rhine Valley line on the Bruchsal–Heidelberg section it is planned to extend the platforms from 140 to 210 metres, so that longer trains can run. This is necessary, above all, because it is not possible to increase the capacity of the line due to the joint use of the Rhine Valley Railway by local passenger, long-distance passenger and freight trains.

The new Stettfeld-Weiher station is being built at line-km 44.185 in the district of Stettfeld in the municipality of Ubstadt-Weiher. It will be served by S-Bahn lines S 3 and S 4 from 15December 2019.

 Mannheim–Schwetzingen–Graben-Neudorf–Karlsruhe 
The line running to the east of the Rhine on the Mannheim–Schwetzingen–Hockenheim–Waghäusel–Graben-Neudorf–Karlsruhe route (the Rhine Railway) will be operated as the new S 8 line, connecting the Rhine Neckar and Karlsruhe S-Bahn networks from December 2020. New S-Bahn stops will be built in Hirschacker and Schwetzingen Nord (expected to open in 2021), while the proposed Graben-Neudorf Süd station is not currently considered feasible.

The stations on the southern section between Graben-Neudorf and Karlsruhe have been upgraded starting in 2011 and 2014 respectively. In the northern part of the line, the Neulußheim and Hockenheim stations already had the required platform lengths and heights, so only lifts had to be retrofitted. Work in Hockenheim and Schwetzingen was completed in March and July 2018 respectively. In Wiesental, Waghäusel and Oftersheim, the platforms have been rebuilt and only minor work is left. However, the completion of the lift and the staircase roofing in Neulußheim has been delayed until December 2019. Due to the special location and construction of the station, large-scale work could only be carried out with a blockade of the whole station.

Two compact stations are to be built in Mannheim-Rheinau and Mannheim-Neckarau, which allow a quick and barrier-free change to the trams and buses of the RNV. This work was finished in Mannheim-Rheinau at the end of April 2018, except for minor residual work, and the "compact station" was officially opened on 12 July 2019. In contrast, the case for building Neckarau station would be "examined in terms of the costs and benefits of the whole line", so it may not in fact be built. Meanwhile, the project team has stated that it expects it to be completed in 2021/2022.

If a bypass of Mannheim is incorporated in the Frankfurt–Mannheim high-speed railway with a new ICE station near Mannheim-Seckenheim, the nearby section of the line would need to be rebuilt to provide for interchange between S-Bahn traffic and the ICE station.

 Mannheim–Biblis–Groß-Rohrheim 
On the Hessian side, the Riedbahn between Mannheim and Groß-Rohrheim is to be integrated into the network of the Rhine Neckar S-Bahn (as line S 9). The line was originally planned to run only as far as Biblis, but the Bergstraße (district) was able to have it extended with the fare boundary between the Verkehrsverbund Rhein-Neckar (VRN) and the Rhein-Main-Verkehrsverbund (RMV) moved to Groß-Rohrheim.

At the end of January 2016, the state of Hesse concluded an implementation and financial agreement with DB Station&Service under which the state of Hesse intends to invest €5 million in the upgrade of five Hessian stations, Lampertheim, Bürstadt, Bobstadt, Biblis and Groß Rohrheim. In addition, affected municipalities are participating through the Zweckverband Verkehrsverbund Rhein-Neckar and providing €8.2 m, while the federal government is providing €11 m. Construction began on 7 July 2016 with a groundbreaking ceremony at Biblis station. Completion was originally planned by the end of 2017, but now it should be finished at the end of 2019.

 Mannheim–Weinheim–Bensheim 
The situation is similar for the Mannheim–Weinheim–Bensheim route on the Main-Neckar Railway. A new station is planned in Weinheim-Sulzbach. A new station is also being considered at Pfungstadt Süd. On the other hand, the proposed stations in Weinheim Süd and Bensheim Süd cannot be built for the time being due to congestion on the line. In the future, the line will be integrated as line S7 of the Rhine Neckar S-Bahn. Weinheim (Bergstraße) Hauptbahnhof should have been rebuilt to S-Bahn standards by June 2016. However, there were delays in the construction due to new information emerging about the state of the ground below the surface near the lift shafts as well as operational issues (the need for passenger services to operate to the timetable). The Mannheim–Weinheim–Bensheim line has been served by the extended S6 line since December 2018.

 Planned operational concept 
The Riedbahn, the Main-Neckar Railway and the Mannheim–Heidelberg line are at their capacity limits due to the high level of long-distance passenger, regional passenger and freight traffic. The connections and cycle times of the S-Bahn must therefore be based on the few remaining train paths on the routes, especially since the longed-for relief that would be provided by the planned Frankfurt–Mannheim high-speed railway has receded into the future.

According to the tenders, the originally planned "around the corner" connection of the two branches to Biblis and Bensheim in Mannheim was rejected as well as the connection from Mainz via Mannheim to Eppingen and Aglasterhausen. Previously, considerations of operating this service between Mannheim Hauptbahnhof and Heidelberg Hauptbahnhof as an express line without intervening stops had already been rejected.

Instead, the operating concept prescribed by the tender stipulates that the main line will be connected from Mainz via Worms and Mannheim to Bensheim. The Riedbahn line from Gross-Rohrheim, on the other hand, would end at Mannheim Hauptbahnhof.

 Rolling stock 

 Class 425 "Rhine-Neckar S-Bahn" sets 
Rolling stock based on the second series of class 425 was used from the start of the Rhine-Neckar S-Bahn in 2002. These sets have a toilet and fewer entrance doors than class 423 sets. They have a floor height of 780 mm. Their folding steps allow a level crossing from the platform.

With the growing network of lines, additional rolling stock was required. Thus, starting in October 2015, 37 additional vehicles were rebuilt for Lot 1 of the Rhine-Neckar S-Bahn in addition to the 40 original S-Bahn trains (425.2), which had previously been mostly used for regional services in the Rhine-Neckar area. But rolling stock was also acquired from Hanover and North Rhine-Westphalia. In total, 77 vehicles (11x 425.0, 40x 425.2, 6x 425.3 and 20x 425.4) were converted during the first phase. A further 14 vehicles were converted in a second phase to April 2018, being first used on line S 6 to Mainz.

The vehicles, which originally had permanently installed steps, received folding steps as part of the rebuild. The seats in second class received new upholstery with leather headrests. In the first class, which consists of 12 seats at the end of car 1, the seats are completely covered with real leather. Poles were used to protect the windows in the multipurpose areas.

In addition, a new passenger information system was installed. 19-inch screens have been installed in the vehicles to provide up-to-date travel information and connection options. Surveillance cameras and USB charging points have been installed in all vehicles. All ticket machines have been removed from the vehicles.

 Class 463 – Siemens Mireo 
For Lot 2, 57 three-part Siemens Mireo sets were ordered in August 2017. These will be used from December 2020 on the new S-Bahn lines.

The 70-meter-long sets have 200 seats, 26 bicycle parking spaces and free Wi-Fi for passengers. An integrated system to bridge gaps should allow people with reduced mobility to make a stepless entry and exit to 76 cm-high platforms without assistance. The exterior finish of the sets will not be Deutsche Bahn red, but light gray with dark grey sections in the door areas and a large S-Bahn logo. The yellow doors should stand out from the dark grey background.

List of names of railcars
The following electric multiple units have city sponsorships:

References
Notes

Sources
 Werner Schreiner: ... an einem Strang''. Ludwigshafen am Rhein 2004,

External links 

 
RheinNeckar
Rail transport in Mannheim
Ludwigshafen
Transport in Heidelberg
2003 establishments in Germany
Deutsche Bahn